St. Stanislaus Catholic High School was a coeducational Catholic high school, opened in Detroit, Michigan, United States in 1928.  The school was opened by St. Stanislaus Bishop and Martyr Roman Catholic Church and run by the Felician Sisters.  It closed in 1973.

References

High schools in Detroit
Defunct Catholic secondary schools in Michigan